Helmet orchid is a common name for several plants and may refer to:

Coryanthes
Corybas
Cranichis
Nematoceras
Pterostylis